Sirs is a surname. Notable people with the surname include:

 Bill Sirs (1920–2015), British trade unionist
 Judith Sirs (born 1954), British swimmer